Tara Moore was the defending champion, but didn't compete in 2012.

Renata Voráčová won the title, defeating Julia Kimmelmann in the final, 7–5, 6–7(6–8), 6–3.

Seeds

Main draw

Finals

Top half

Bottom half

References 
 Main draw

Aegon Pro-Series Loughborough - Women's Singles
2012 Women's Singles